Ferndale High School is the only high school in Ferndale, Washington. Ferndale High School (FHS) is located on the coast of Puget Sound, in the northwest region of Washington State.

The school has a diverse student population that includes members of the nearby Lummi Nation and immigrants from Asia and Europe.

Notable graduates
Michael Koenen, punter, Atlanta Falcons (2005-2010), Tampa Bay Buccaneers (2011-2014)
Jake Locker, quarterback, Tennessee Titans (2011–2014),
Daran Norris, voice actor (Ned's Declassified School Survival Guide, The Fairly Odd Parents)
Doug Pederson, Philadelphia Eagles' head coach (2016–2020 ), NFL quarterback (1993–2004).

References

External links
FHS Website
OSPI school report card

High schools in Whatcom County, Washington
Public high schools in Washington (state)